Dami Elebe is a Nigerian screenwriter known for web series like Skinny Girl In Transit, Rumour Has It and Far From Home (2022 series). She is an on-air personality, an artist and a musician. Elebe studied advertising and art.

Career 
Elebe was an on-air personality (OAP) at Classic FM, Beat FM and Naija FM in the space of 7 years and wrote the movie, Up North which was directed by Tope Oshin. At the ELOY Awards in 2018, she received the Scriptwriter Of The Year award. Her debut film was From Lagos With Love, which was at the cinemas in August 2018. She worked with Sharon Ooja, Nonso Bassey, Jon Ogah, Etim Effiong, Damilola Adegbite, and Shaffy Bello.

On August 7, 2018, she announced on her official Instagram page that she will be leaving Beat FM, describing her time with the radio station as a 'great ride'.

References

Lee University alumni
Participants in Nigerian reality television series
Living people
Year of birth missing (living people)
Nigerian screenwriters
Women screenwriters
Nigerian women artists
Nigerian radio presenters
Nigerian women radio presenters
Nigerian women musicians
Nigerian media personalities